Sherman Douglas (born September 15, 1966) is an American former professional basketball player from Syracuse University who played for the Miami Heat, Boston Celtics, Milwaukee Bucks, New Jersey Nets and the Los Angeles Clippers from 1989 to 2001.  His nickname, The General is a play on his first name and his position as a point guard (as a floor general). He was known for revolutionizing the running "floater" shot in the lane.

Career
In his four year career for Syracuse he helped lead them to the 1987 Final Four, the first of Coach Jim Boeheim's career. Sherman Douglas set the all-time NCAA assist record with the Syracuse Orangemen in 1989 before becoming the Heat's first starting point guard.  Although he was a second-round draft choice in 1989, his strong campaign (14.3 ppg and 7.6 apg) earned him a spot on the NBA's All-Rookie First Team.  He bettered that campaign in 1990–91, when he led the Heat in scoring (18.5) and assists (8.5) and was named the team's most valuable player.

After holding out before the 1991–92 season, Douglas played five games with Miami before being dealt to the Boston Celtics for Brian Shaw on January 10, 1992. Douglas would play the best basketball of his career for the Boston Celtics, managing to pilot the team to the playoffs in 1994–1995 season despite their 35–47 record in the final season of the Boston Garden.  Douglas averaged 14.7 points and 6.9 assists per game that year.

He played for the Los Angeles Clippers in the 1998–99 season and then was traded back to the Nets the season after.

During his career, Douglas played against Michael Jordan 30 times and lost all 30 games.

NBA career statistics

Regular season

|-
| align="left" | 1989–90
| align="left" | Miami
| 81 || 66 || 30.5 || .494 || .161 || .687 || 2.5 || 7.6 || 1.8 || 0.1 || 14.3
|-
| align="left" | 1990–91
| align="left" | Miami
| 73 || 73 || 35.1 || .504 || .129 || .686 || 2.9 || 8.5 || 1.7 || 0.1 || 18.5
|-
| align="left" | 1991–92
| align="left" | Miami
| 5 || 2 || 19.6 || .516 || .000 || .714 || 1.2 || 3.8 || 0.8 || 0.0 || 7.4
|-
| align="left" | 1991–92
| align="left" | Boston
| 37 || 0 || 17.7 || .455 || .111 || .680 || 1.5 || 4.1 || 0.6 || 0.2 || 7.3
|-
| align="left" | 1992–93
| align="left" | Boston
| 79 || 36 || 24.5 || .498 || .207 || .560 || 2.1 || 6.4 || 0.6 || 0.1 || 7.8
|-
| align="left" | 1993–94
| align="left" | Boston
| 78 || 78 || 35.8 || .462 || .232 || .641 || 2.5 || 8.8 || 1.1 || 0.1 || 13.3
|-
| align="left" | 1994–95
| align="left" | Boston
| 65 || 43 || 31.5 || .475 || .244 || .689 || 2.6 || 6.9 || 1.2 || 0.0 || 14.7
|-
| align="left" | 1995–96
| align="left" | Boston
| 10 || 4 || 23.4 || .429 || .143 || .625 || 2.3 || 3.9 || 0.2 || 0.0 || 9.8
|-
| align="left" | 1995–96
| align="left" | Milwaukee
| 69 || 62 || 30.4 || .514 || .379 || .754 || 2.3 || 5.8 || 0.9 || 0.1 || 11.5
|-
| align="left" | 1996–97
| align="left" | Milwaukee
| 79 || 79 || 29.3 || .502 || .333 || .667 || 2.4 || 5.4 || 1.0 || 0.1 || 9.7
|-
| align="left" | 1997–98
| align="left" | New Jersey
| 80 || 11 || 21.2 || .495 || .304 || .669 || 1.7 || 4.0 || 0.7 || 0.1 || 8.0
|-
| align="left" | 1998–99
| align="left" | Los Angeles
| 30 || 19 || 28.1 || .438 || .000 || .632 || 1.9 || 4.1 || 0.9 || 0.1 || 8.2
|-
| align="left" | 1999–00
| align="left" | New Jersey
| 20 || 2 || 15.5 || .500 || .313 || .893 || 1.5 || 1.7 || 0.9 || 0.0 || 6.0
|-
| align="left" | 2000–01
| align="left" | New Jersey
| 59 || 7 || 18.5 || .403 || .200 || .748 || 1.3 || 2.4 || 0.6 || 0.1 || 5.7
|- class="sortbottom"
| style="text-align:center;" colspan="2"| Career
| 765 || 482 || 27.6 || .484 || .267 || .678 || 2.2 || 5.9 || 1.0 || 0.1 || 11.0
|}

Playoffs

|-
| align="left" | 1991–92
| align="left" | Boston
| 6 || 0 || 10.8 || .360 || .000 || .500 || 0.7 || 1.7 || 0.0 || 0.0 || 3.2
|-
| align="left" | 1992–93
| align="left" | Boston
| 4 || 4 || 41.5 || .378 || .000 || .667 || 6.5 || 9.5 || 1.0 || 0.0 || 11.0
|-
| align="left" | 1994–95
| align="left" | Boston
| 4 || 4 || 42.0 || .353 || .333 || .727 || 5.0 || 8.3 || 1.0 || 0.3 || 15.0
|-
| align="left" | 1997–98
| align="left" | New Jersey
| 3 || 2 || 41.7 || .523 || .400 || .700 || 2.7 || 8.3 || 2.0 || 0.0 || 18.3
|- class="sortbottom"
| style="text-align:center;" colspan="2"| Career
| 17 || 10 || 30.8 || .401 || .273 || .684 || 3.4 || 6.2 || 0.8 || 0.1 || 10.5
|}

See also
 List of National Basketball Association players with most assists in a game
 List of NCAA Division I men's basketball players with 20 or more assists in a game
 List of NCAA Division I men's basketball career assists leaders

References

External links
College & NBA stats
OrangeHoops Profile on Sherman Douglas

1966 births
Living people
African-American basketball players
All-American college men's basketball players
American men's basketball players
Basketball players from Washington, D.C.
Boston Celtics players
Los Angeles Clippers players
Miami Heat draft picks
Miami Heat players
Milwaukee Bucks players
New Jersey Nets players
Point guards
Syracuse Orange men's basketball players
21st-century African-American people
20th-century African-American sportspeople